Alex Wagner Tonight  is an American liberal news and opinion television program hosted by Alex Wagner. It premiered on MSNBC on August 16, 2022, and airs on Tuesdays through Fridays as a substitute for The Rachel Maddow Show (which, since May 2022, has only aired on Monday nights).

Guest hosts for the series include Ali Velshi, Alicia Menendez, Mehdi Hasan and Ayman Mohyeldin.

History 
From February to April 2022, as part of her new contract with NBCUniversal, Rachel Maddow took an extended hiatus from her MSNBC program The Rachel Maddow Show in order to focus on other film and podcast projects, with rotating guest hosts filling in for her. Upon Maddow's return, she announced that she would only host the show on Monday nights beginning in May, and continue to feature guest hosts throughout the rest of the week.

At this point, The Rachel Maddow Show was retitled MSNBC Prime on Tuesday through Friday nights, but retained the same staff and overall format. Average viewership of the hour as MSNBC Prime was lower than that of The Rachel Maddow Show, but still ahead of timeslot competitor CNN Tonight (a replacement of Cuomo Prime Time with rotating hosts after Chris Cuomo was fired from the network) and behind Fox News Channel's Hannity.

In June 2022, MSNBC announced that MSNBC Prime would be replaced by a new show hosted by Alex Wagner beginning on August 16. On August 3, MSNBC announced that the program would be titled Alex Wagner Tonight.

Wagner stated that the show would aim to combine Maddow's "intellectual rigor and informative analysis" with aspects that are representative of her own personal experiences, including more segments in the field and segments on climate change, immigration, and race. The program retains some of Maddow's staff, including executive producer Cory Gnazzo. The series premiere of Alex Wagner Tonight—which featured guests Mark Leibovich, Adam Kinzinger, and Joyce Vance, as well as coverage of Wyoming's Republican primary—was seen by around 2 million viewers.

References 

2022 American television series debuts
2020s American television news shows
English-language television shows
MSNBC original programming